Ulrich Jasper Seetzen (30 January 1767September 1811) was a German explorer of Arabia and Palestine from Jever, German Frisia. An alternative spelling of his name, Ulrich Iospar Sentzen, is sometimes seen in scientific publications.

Early life
His father sent him to the University of Göttingen, where he graduated in medicine. His chief interests, however, were in natural history and technology; he wrote papers on both these subjects which gained him some reputation, and had both in view in making a series of journeys through the Netherlands and Germany. He also engaged in various small manufactures, and in 1802 obtained a government post in Jever, however, the interest which he had long felt in geographical exploration culminated in a resolution to travel.

Travels to Jordan and Palestine
In the summer of 1802 he started down the Danube with a companion Jacobsen, who broke down at Smyrna a year later. His journey was by Constantinople, where he stayed six months, thence through Asia Minor to Smyrna, then again through the heart of Asia Minor to Aleppo, where he remained from November 1803 to April 1805, and made himself sufficiently at home with Arabic speech and ways to travel as a native. Now began the part of his travels of which a full journal has been published (April 1808 to March 1809), a series of most instructive journeys in Jordan and Palestine and the wilderness of Sinai, and so on to Cairo and the Fayum.

His chief exploit was a tour round the Dead Sea, which he made without a companion and in the disguise of a beggar. From Egypt he went by sea to Jeddah and reached Mecca as a pilgrim in October 1809. After his pilgrimage he converted to Islam and changed his name to Musa Al-Hakim.

In Arabia he made extensive journeys, ranging from Medina to Lahak and returning to Mocha, from which place his last letters to Europe were written in November 1810. In September of the following year he left Mocha with the hope of reaching Muscat, but was found dead two days later, allegedly poisoned by his guides on orders from the imam of Sana'a.

Publications

His exploits were first published in 1810 by the British Palestine Association.

For the parts of Seetzen's journeys not covered by the published journal (Reisen, ed. Kruse, 4 vols, Berlin, 1854), the only printed records are a series of letters and papers in Zach's Monatliche Correspondenz and Hammer's Fundgruben. Many papers and collections were lost through his death or never reached Europe. The collections that were saved form the Oriental museum and the chief part of the Oriental manuscripts of the ducal library in Gotha.

The American scholar Edward Robinson, writing in 1841, called Seetzen "judicious, enterprising and indefatigable."

Honours
In 1826, Robert Brown published Seetzenia which is a genus of flowering plants from Africa and Asia, belonging to the family Zygophyllaceae and named in his honour.

See also 
 Danish Arabia expedition (1761–67)

References

Bibliography

alt.:  
alt.:  

alt.: 

alt.: 

alt.:   

alt: 

1767 births
1811 deaths
University of Göttingen alumni
Converts to Islam
German explorers
Explorers of Asia
Explorers of Arabia
Holy Land travellers
German expatriates in the Ottoman Empire
Male murder victims
Assassinated explorers
German people murdered abroad
German orientalists
German murder victims